Sheldyakovo is a rural locality (a village) in Tolpukhovskoye Rural Settlement, Sobinsky District, Vladimir Oblast, Russia. The population was 16 as of 2010.

Geography 
Sheldyakovo is located 23 km north of Sobinka (the district's administrative centre) by road. Dobrynino is the nearest rural locality.

References 

Rural localities in Sobinsky District